Faded Glamour: The Best of Animals That Swim is a 2004 compilation best-of album by British alternative rock band Animals That Swim, released in 2004 via Snowstorm.

Critical reception
Kitty Empire in The Guardian rued  Animals That Swim relative lack of success compared to some peers "Too dignified to chase fame, too rueful for the Britpop bandwagon and plagued by terrible luck" but that this "compilation of their touchstones sorely deserves a fanfare." Title song "Faded Glamour" is a "criminally unheard of gem of its era... the 14 tracks take in their happiest song 'Madame Yevonde', the elegant 'East St O'Neill' and the fabulously sodden 'King Beer': songs too good to be left exclusively to the recollections of sentimental music journalists." Uncut said this "judiciously selected collection highlights their ennui-soaked glory perfectly." They highlight the "yearning, hyper-literate twilight pop (Leonard Cohen romanticism multiplied by The Teardrop Explodes)" and their "intelligent barfly persona, particularly the bizarre imaginary tale of Roy Orbison on 'Roy' and the doleful 'King Beer', made them a haven from gormless grunge."

Track listing 
 Faded Glamour
 Pink Carnations
 Longest Road
 Roy
 All Your Stars Are Out
 Dirt
 Smooth Steps
 Moon and the Mothership
 East St O'Neill
 Madame Yevonde
 50 Dresses
 Mackie's Wake
 King Beer
 7 Days

Personnel
'''Animals That Swim
Hank Starrs – drums, lead vocals, artwork
Hugh Barker – guitar, keyboards, melodica, harmonica, vocals, lead vocals
Al Barker – piano, hammond organ, guitar, vocals
Del Crabtree – trumpet, talking, artwork
Anthony Coote – bass guitar, guitar, percussion, additional vocals

References

2004 compilation albums
Animals That Swim albums